William Tripp may refer to:

 William Tripp (politician) (1817–1878), Maine and South Dakota politician, lawyer and surveyor
 William H. Tripp Jr (1920–1971), designer of the sailboat Invicta
 Jack Tripp (William John Charles Spencer Tripp, 1922–2005), British comedian and pantomime artist
 Billy Tripp (William Blevins Tripp, born 1955), Tennessee artist